Branchinella wellardi is a species of crustacean in the family Thamnocephalidae. It is endemic to Australia.

See also
 Branchinella spinosa

References

Branchiopoda
Freshwater crustaceans of Australia
Vulnerable fauna of Australia
Crustaceans described in 1929
Taxonomy articles created by Polbot